Ketti Frings (28 February 1909 – 11 February 1981) was an American writer, playwright, and screenwriter who won a Pulitzer Prize in 1958.

Biography

Early years
Born Katherine Hartley in Columbus, Ohio, Frings attended Principia College, began her career as a copywriter, and went on to work as a feature writer for United Press International.

Career
In 1941 her novel Hold Back the Dawn was adapted for the screen. The resulting movie was directed by Mitchell Leisen and starred Olivia de Havilland and Charles Boyer. She wrote her first Broadway play, Mr. Sycamore, in 1942. The play featured Lillian Gish and Stuart Erwin in the lead roles.

Her Hollywood screenplays include Guest in the House (1944),  The File on Thelma Jordon (1950), Come Back, Little Sheba (1952), About Mrs. Leslie (1954), The Shrike (1955),  and Foxfire (1955).

Frings adapted the Thomas Wolfe novel Look Homeward, Angel into a play of the same name that opened on Broadway in 1957 and ran for 564 performances at the Ethel Barrymore Theatre. It received six Tony Award nominations and Frings won the annual Pulitzer Prize for Drama in 1958. She was named "Woman of the Year" by The Los Angeles Times in the same year.

Personal life
Frings was married to film agent Kurt Frings from 1938 to October 31, 1958. The couple had two children, Kathie and Peter. She died of cancer in Los Angeles.

Bibliography
Hold Back the Dawn (novel), 1940
Mr. Sycamore (play), 1942
God's Front Porch (novel), 1944
Look Homeward, Angel (play), 1957
The Long Dream (play), 1960
Walking Happy (play), 1966

References

Sources
 
 Contemporary Authors Online Gale, 2004.

External links
 
 
 

1909 births
1981 deaths
Screenwriters from Ohio
Pulitzer Prize for Drama winners
Writers from Columbus, Ohio
Principia College alumni
American women screenwriters
Deaths from cancer in California
American women dramatists and playwrights
20th-century American dramatists and playwrights
20th-century American women writers
Pulitzer Prize winners
20th-century American screenwriters